The Minister of Defence of the Republic of Sudan is the government minister responsible for the Ministry of Defence and the Sudanese Armed Forces.

History 
After independence, Prime Minister Abdallah Khalil, secretary of the National Umma Party, served as Minister of Defence.

The President of Sudan was responsible for appointing the Minister of Defence.

After the overthrow of General Ibrahim Abboud's regime in October 1964, Lieutenant General El Khawad Mohmamed was appointed as a member of the ruling Supreme Council of the Armed Forces and commander-in-chief of the Sudanese Armed Forces.

Then-Colonel Jaafar Nimeiri came to power in the 1969 Sudanese coup d'état. Khalid Hassan Abbas was appointed as Minister of Defense on 29 October 1969 following a cabinet reshuffle implemented to strengthen the army's control over the Sudanese government. Abbas was an anti-Mahdist and non-communist. As Defense Minister he, alongside Babiker, would push President Nimeiri to adopt a more aggressive response to the rising threat to the government posed by the Ansar movement, resulting in the brutal crackdown seen on Aba Island in 1970. Abbas served as Defense Minister until 16 April 1972, at which point Nimeiri took over the role.

U.S. personnel met Defence Minister General Abdul Majid Hamid Khalil (known in the Sudan as Abdul Majid) in 1979.
Two days after the signing of the peace agreement between Ahmed al-Mirghani and John Garang on 16 November 1988, a Sudanese Air Force Lockheed C-130 Hercules carrying Abdul Majid from Wau to Khartoum, together with the Army Commander-in-Chief, General Fathi Ahmed Ali, was hit by a missile, knocking out one of its engines. In January 1982, President Nimeiri again assumed the office himself after retiring Abdul Majid, who had been simultaneously First Vice President, Minister of Defence, commander-in-chief of the armed forces, and secretary-general of the single ruling Sudanese Socialist Union party.

Nimeiri had served himself as Minister of Defence for long stretches in 1972-73 (promoted himself General in 1973), 1975–76, and 1978-79 after retiring other ministers. From 1976-78, the Minister of Defence has usually held the rank of General, when Bashir Mohamed Ali held the position.

Since the accession of the Sovereignty Council of Sudan, the effective commander-in-chief of the armed forces is Lieutenant General Abdel Fattah al-Burhan, former head of the Transitional Military Council.

Ministers of Defence 
Ministers of Defence have included:

References

External links 
List of Ministers of Defence from the Sudanese official archived website

Defence